Eduard von Martens (18 April 1831 – 14 August 1904) also known as Carl or Karl Eduard von Martens, was a German zoologist.

Born in Stuttgart in 1831, von Martens attended university in Tübingen, where he graduated in 1855.

In 1860, he embarked on the Thetis expedition of the Prussian expedition to Eastern Asia. When the expedition returned to Europe in 1862, von Martens continued to travel around Maritime Southeast Asia for 15 months. He published the results of the "Thetis" expedition   in two volumes, constituting the Zoologischer Theil of the "Preussische Expedition nach Ost-Asien." Vol. ii, consisting of 447 pages and 22 plates, contained a very full account of the land molluscs.

Back in Berlin, von Martens was curator of the malacological and other invertebrate sections until his death.

Von Martens described 155 new genera (150 of them molluscs) and almost 1,800 species (including around 1,680 molluscs, 39 crustaceans, and 50 echinoderms).

He was a foreign member of the Linnean Society of London, and a corresponding member of the Zoological Society of London.

Bibliography 
Besides many memoirs, von Martens wrote over 200 separate papers in scientific publications. Besides his work on Mollusca, von Martens wrote upon all branches of zoology, but especially upon Crustacea and Echinoderms..

1850s
 1856. 
 1857. 
 1858. 
 1858. 
 1859. 
 1859. 
 1859. 
 1859. 
1860s
 1860. Die Heliceen, nach natürlicher Verwandtschaft systematisch geordnet. Wilhelm Engelmann, Leipzig. (with Johann Christian Albers)
 1860. 
 1860. 
 1860. 
 1861. 
 1861. 
 1863. 
 1863. 
 1863. 
 1863. 
 1863. 
 1864. 
 1864. 
 1864. 
 1864. 
 1864. 
 1864. 
 1864. 
 1864. 
 1864. 
 1865. 
 1865. 
 1865. 
 1865. 
 1865. 
 1865. 
 1865. 
 1866. 
 1866. 
 1866. 
 1866. 
 1866. Genus Lanistes Montfort. In: Novitates Conchologicae. Series Prima. Mollusca extramarina. Beschreibung und Abbildung neuer oder kritischer Land- und Süßwassermollusken., vol. 2 Pfeiffer, K. ed., 285–295
 1867. Die Preussische Expedition nach Ost-Asien. Nach amtlichen Quellen. Zoologischer Theil. Zweiter Band. Die Landschnecken, vol. 2, Königliche Geheime Ober-Hofbuchdruckerei, Berlin
 1867. 
 1867. 
 1867. 
 1867. 
 1867. 
 1867. 
 1868. 
 1868. 
 1868. 
 1868. 
 1868. 
 1868. Description of a new species. In: Novitates Conchologicae. Series Prima. Mollusca extramarina. Beschreibung und Abbildung neuer oder kritischer Land- und Süßwassermollusken., vol. 3 Pfeiffer, K. ed., 381
 1869. Mollusken. In: Baron Carl Claus von der Decken's Reisen in Ost-Afrika in den Jahren 1859–1865, vol. 3 Wissenschaftliche Ergebnisse, Part 1, Säugethiere, Vögel, Amphibien, Crustaceen, Mollusken und Echinodermen Kersten, O. ed., 53–66
 1869. Uebersicht der Land- und Süsswassermollusken der ostafrikanischen Küste von Cap Guardafui bis Port Natal nebst nächstliegenden Inseln. In: Baron Carl Claus von der Decken's Reisen in Ost-Afrika in den Jahren 1859–1865, vol. 3 Wissenschaftliche Ergebnisse, Part 1, Säugethiere, Vögel, Amphibien, Crustaceen, Mollusken und Echinodermen Kersten, O. ed., 148–160
 1869. 
 1869. 
 1869. 
 1869. 
1870s
 1870. 
 1870. 
 1870. 
 1871. 
 1871. 
 1871. Donum Bismarckianum. Eine Sammlung von Südsee-Conchylien, Ferdinand Berggold, Berlin (mit B. Langkavel)
 1872. 
 1872. 
 1873. Description of a new species. In: Catalogue of the marine Mollusca of New Zealand, with diagnoses of the species, vol. Hutton, F.W. ed.
 1873. Critical list of the Mollusca of New Zealand contained in European collections, with references to descriptions and synonyms, Government printer, Wellington
 1873. Die Binnenmollusken Venezuela's. In: Festschrift zur Feier des hundertjähringen Bestehens der Gesellschaft naturforschender Freunde zu Berlin, vol. Reichert, K.B. ed., 157–225
 1873. 
 1873. 
 1873. 
 1874. Sliznyaki Mollusca. In: Reise in Turkestan von Alexis Fedtschenkow. Auf Veranlassung des General-Gouverneurs von Turestan, General Kaufmann Gesellschaft der Freunde der Naturwissenschaften in Moskau ed., vol. 2 Zoologischer Theil 1 Fedchencko, A.P. ed.
 1874. Ueber vorderasiatische Conchylien, nach den Sammlungen des Prof. Hausknecht. In: Novitates Conchologicae. Series Prima. Mollusca extramarina. Beschreibung und Abbildung neuer oder kritischer Land- und Süßwassermollusken., vol. 5 Pfeiffer, K. ed.
 1874. 
 1874. 
 1874. 
 1874. 
 1874. 
 1874. 
 1874. 
 1874. 
 1874. 
 1874. 
 1875. Die Gattung Neritina. In: Systematisches Conchylien-Cabinet von Martini und Chemnitz, vol. 2, 1–64
 1875. 
 1875. 
 1875. 
 1875. 
 1875. 
 1875. 
 1875. 
 1875. 
 1876. 
 1876. 
 1876. 
 1876. 
 1876. 
 1876. 
 1876. 
 1876. 
 1876. 
 1876. 
 1876. Description of nonmarine Mollusca. In: Novitates Conchologicae. Series Prima. Mollusca extramarina. Beschreibung und Abbildung neuer oder kritischer Land- und Süßwassermollusken., vol. 4 Pfeiffer, K. ed., 145–171
 1876. Die Bulimus-Arten aus der Gruppe Borus. In: Novitates Conchologicae. Series Prima. Mollusca extramarina. Beschreibung und Abbildung neuer oder kritischer Land- und Süßwassermollusken., vol. 5 Pfeiffer, K. ed., 1–26
 1877. Die Gattung Neritina. In: Systematisches Conchylien-Cabinet von Martini und Chemnitz, vol. 2, 65–144
 1877. 
 1877. 
 1877. 
 1877. Description of nonmarine Mollusca. In: Novitates Conchologicae. Series Prima. Mollusca extramarina. Beschreibung und Abbildung neuer oder kritischer Land- und Süßwassermollusken., vol. 5 Pfeiffer, K. ed., 29–38
 1877. 
 1877. 
 1878. Die Gattung Neritiana. In. Novitates Conchologicae. Series Prima. Mollusca extramarina. Beschreibung und Abbildung neuer oder kritischer Land- und Süßwassermollusken., vol. 2 Pfeiffer, K. ed., 145–208
 1878. Kaukasische Conchylien. In: Naturwissenschaftliche Beiträge zur Kenntnis der Kaukasusländer, auf Grund seiner Sammelbeute, Schneider, O. ed., 11–34
 1878. 
 1878. 
 1878. 
 1879. 
 1879. Descriptions of nonmarine Mollusca. In: Novitates Conchologicae. Series Prima. Mollusca extramarina. Beschreibung und Abbildung neuer oder kritischer Land- und Süßwassermollusken., vol. 5 Pfeiffer, K. ed., 175–197
 1879. 
 1879. 
 1879. 
 1879. 
1880s
 1880. Mollusken. In: Beiträge zur Meeresfauna der Insel Mauritius und der Seychellen, vol. Möbius, K. ed., 181–352
 1880. 
 1880. 
 1880. 
 1880. 
 1880. 
 1880. 
 1881. Die Gattung Navicella. In. Systematisches Conchylien-Cabinet von Martini und Chemnitz, vol. 2, 1–40
 1881. 
 1881. 
 1881. 
 1881. 
 1881. 
 1881. 
 1881. 
 1882. Die Gattung Navicella. In: Systematisches Conchylien-Cabinet von Martini und Chemnitz, vol. 2, 41–56
 1882. 
 1882. 
 1882. 
 1882. 
 1882. 
 1883. 
 1883. 
 1883. 
 1883. 
 1883. 
 1883. 
 1884. 
 1885. 
 1885. 
 1885. 
 1885. 
 1885. 
 1885. 
 1885. 
 1885. 
 1885. 
 1885. 
 1886. Description of a new Physa. In: Systematisches Conchylien-Cabinet von Martini und Chemnitz, vol. 1 Clessin, S. ed., 350
 1886. Mollusca. In: M.M. Schepman, Systematische lijst, met beschrijving der nieuwe soorten.. In. Midden-Sumatra. Reizen en onderzoekingen der Sumatra-Expeditie ... Deel IV Natuurlijke Historie, I Fauna, 3, vol. 3 Veth, P.J. ed., 5–18
 1886. 
 1886. 
 1886. 
 1886. 
 1886 (with G. Pfeiffer). 
 1887–1889. Die Gattung Nerita und Neritopsis. In: Systematisches Conchylien-Cabinet von Martini und Chemnitz, vol. 2, 1–64
 1887. 
 1887. 
 1887. 
 1888. 
 1888. 
 1888. 
 1888. 
 1889. 
 1889. 
 1889. 
 1889. 
 1889. 
 1889. 
 1889. 
 1889. 
1890s
 1890–1901. 
 1890. 
 1890. 
 1890. 
 1891. Landschnecken des Indischen Archipels. In: Ergebnisse einer Reise in Niederländisch Ost-Indien, vol. Weber, M. ed., 209–263
 1891. 
 1891. 
 1891. 
 1891. 
 1891. 
 1892. 
 1892. 
 1892. 
 1894. Description of a new Limicolaria. In: W.Kobelt, Die Genera Livihacia, Pseudachatina, Perideris, Limicolaria, und Homorus. In: Systematisches Conchylien-Cabinet von Martini und Chemnitz, vol. 1, 72
 1894. 
 1894. 
 1894. 
 1894. Mollusken. In. Zoologische Forschungsreisen in Australien und dem malayischen Archipel, ser. Denkschriften der medicinisch-naturwissenschaftlichen Gesellschaft zu Jena, 8, vol. 5 Semon, R. ed., 83–96
 1894. 
 1894. 
 1894. 
 1895. 
 1895. 
 1895. 
 1895. 
 1895. 
 1895. 
 1895. 
 1896. 
 1897. Süss- und Brackwasser Mollusken des Indischen Archipels.. In. Zoologische Ergebnisse einer Reise in Niederländisch Ost-Indien, vol. 4 Weber, M. ed., 1–331
 1897. Beschalte Weichthiere Deutsch-Ost-Afrikas. In: Deutsch-Ost-Afrika, vol. 4 Stuhlmann, F. ed.
 1897. 
 1897. 
 1898. 
 1898. 
 1898. 
 1899. Mollusca. In: Symbolae Physicae sei icones adhuc ineditae corporum naturalium novorum aut minus cognitorum quae ex per Libyam ... . Zoologica Carlgren, F., Hilgendorf, F., Martens, E.v., Matschie, P., Tornier, G. & Weltner, W. ed., 11–12
 1899. 
1900s
 1900. 
 1900. 
 1900. 
 1900. 
 1900. 
 1901. 
 1901. 
 1901. 
 1902. 
 1902. 
 1902. 
 1903. 
 1903. 
 1903. 
 1903. 
 1904. Die beschalten Gastropoden der deutschen Tiefsee-Expedition, 1898–1899.. In. A. Systematisch-geographischer Theil., vol. 7 Wissenschaftliche Ergebnisse der deutschen Tiefsee-Expedition auf dem Dampfer "Valdivia" 1898–1899, 1–146
 1904. Anhang VII. Mollusken. In. Die Kalahari. Versuch einer physisch-geographischen Darstellung der Sandfelder des südafrikanischen Beckens Passarge, S. ed., 754–759
 1905. 
 1908 (with Johannes Thiele).

See also
:Category:Taxa named by Eduard von Martens

References 

 Obituary notes in Journal of Molluscan Studies 6.6 (1905): 315-318

External links 
 
 

German malacologists
German carcinologists
1831 births
1904 deaths
19th-century German zoologists
Fellows of the Linnean Society of London
Scientists from Stuttgart
University of Tübingen alumni